Vigilante 8: Arcade is a vehicular combat video game developed by Isopod Labs and published by Activision. It was released on November 5, 2008, for Xbox 360 through Xbox Live Arcade. Isopod Labs was formed by three former members of Luxoflux, developer of the original Vigilante 8 series. A remake of Vigilante 8 with some elements of Vigilante 8: Second Offense included, Vigilante 8: Arcade features online play for up to eight players.

Vigilante 8: Arcade received mixed reviews. Reviewers were divided; multiple reviewers felt the game was a good fit for Xbox Live, with one reviewer calling it "a glorious throwback to a simpler age in gaming". Others praised the game's online multiplayer component and the game's salvage upgrade system. Some reviewers, however, felt that the vehicle physics were poor.

Gameplay

Vigilante 8: Arcade is a vehicular combat game in which vehicles are outfitted with weaponry to combat opponents.  Each vehicle is equipped with machine guns and one special attack that is unique to that vehicle. Weapon powerups are littered throughout each map and can range from heat seeking missiles to mines. Each can be fired in a total of four ways, the weapon's standard operation and via three specialized, more powerful attacks unique to that weapon. The game uses a salvage point upgrade system similar to Vigilante 8: Second Offense, meaning that vehicles can be upgraded by picking up salvage point icons dropped by enemies.

V8 Arcade features four single player game modes.  In Quest mode, players choose a character and play through the game from that character's perspective, learning about the character's background as the game progresses.  In Quick Battle, players are brought straight to a random battle in a random vehicle to fight against random enemies until the player is either dead or victorious.  Custom Battle is similar, but allows players to choose the vehicle(s) and the arena to play in.  Free Wheelin' is a mode with no AI that allows players to drive around the environment, searching for secrets and learning the layout.  Multiplayer can be played with up to four players via splitscreen, and up to eight players online via Xbox Live. It features two modes, Deathmatch, which pits all players against each other, and Team Co-Op, where two human players work together against AI opponents.

The game includes five levels, each inspired by original Vigilante 8 and Vigilante 8: Second Offense levels, but with modified layouts.  Some of the game's levels are inspired by multiple levels from the previous games, melded together to create a new environment.  Two additional levels were available via downloadable content. The first, Stunt Track, is a circular track that has ramps, loops and other daredevil-esque hazards. The second, Garage, is an oversized level set in a giant garage, making vehicles the size of an RC car.

Synopsis
V8 Arcade is built around an alternate history, in which there was a serious worldwide oil crisis in the 1970s. The United States was on the verge of economic breakdown, with crime, strikes and riots rampant.

All available law enforcement was called into the major cities, leaving the countryside and outlands vulnerable. A foreign multinational oil consortium, Oil Monopoly Alliance Regime (OMAR), sought to monopolize the world oil trade. OMAR hired professional terrorist Sid Burn to wreak havoc and destroy the US economy.

Sid organized a group of terrorists to help him with his mission. Calling themselves the Coyotes, they began to destroy oil refineries, commercial installations and other vital industries throughout the southwestern United States. With law enforcement all in the cities, civilians began to take the law into their own hands. A trucker known as Convoy organized a group to combat the Coyotes, taking the name of the Vigilantes.

As conditions continued to deteriorate, the US government focused all its research and development to a new military arsenal. The most advanced weaponry, based on alien technology, was located at Site-4, a secret facility at Papoose Lake. Word of the facility was leaked to Sid, and the Coyotes ambushed Site-4. As Sid and his gang packed up the weaponry, the Vigilantes unexpectedly arrived to stop them. As a result, both parties found themselves in possession of the world's most advanced weaponry.

Characters
A total of eight characters are available at the start of the game, similar to the original Vigilante 8, with each of their vehicles coming with five different colors to choose from. They also have their own story mode, which unlocks the original vehicle model from Vigilante 8 for use in all game modes upon completion. There is also one unlockable character, and downloadable content featuring more characters.

Development and marketing
Vigilante 8 Arcade was announced in February 2008. The game's developer, Isopod Labs, consisted of three key individuals responsible for much of the production of the original Vigilante 8. The studio consisted of just six individuals and a small number of art contractors, and the title's development was self-funded. Isopod Labs originally looked to a June release; however, the game was not originally submitted for Xbox Live certification until August 12. Testers found issues on Microsoft's end in relation to the QNet code library. The issue was resolved by both parties and the game was sent back to Microsoft for resubmission. In a post-release interview with Joystiq Isopod Labs' Adrian Stephens added that "the certification issue is a tricky one and more could be done to smooth the path towards certification". Vigilante 8 Arcade passed Microsoft's Xbox Live certification on September 24  and was released November 5, 2008.

Although the cars are mostly based on the original Vigilante 8, the soundtrack is a remixed version of the music from Vigilante 8: 2nd Offense. V8 Arcade supports the Xbox Live Vision camera, allowing players to see their opponents face to face. Developers Isopod Labs also converted the original cars from Vigilante 8 as unlockable bonus content. J3Concepts also created a custom theme for the original blades Xbox 360 dashboard. A downloadable content add-on known as the High Octane pack was released on Xbox Live marketplace on December 3, a month after the game's release. It featured three new characters and two new levels.

Reception

Vigilante 8 Arcade received "mixed" reviews according to the review aggregation website Metacritic.

Reviewers generally remarked on the game's multiplayer as its strong point.  Official Xbox Magazine UK reviewer Ryan King called V8 Arcade "a glorious throwback to a simpler age in gaming". He further applauded the game's online multiplayer, stating that it was some of the best that Xbox Live Arcade has to offer players. Cheat Code Central's Jason Lauritzen felt the game was nostalgic. Nate Ahearn of IGN welcomed the game's salvage gameplay mechanic while also praising the online multiplayer. Official Xbox Magazines Mitch Dyer also commented on the strong multiplayer, and added positive remarks on the amount of weaponry and number of firing modes per weapon.  TeamXbox's Tom Price noted the game's "big levels, tons of weapon pickups, and crazy opponents" calling them "simple and effective".  Reviewer Andrew Hayward of 1UP.com stated the game's predecessors "built a solid foundation for taking the series online" adding that the game as fun when "pounding mortar shots and missiles at some unfortunate foe from afar".

Critics were disappointed in the poor controls, gameplay glitches, and game camera issues. OXM's Dyer commented that the game had "crummy controls" and a poor camera. Reviewer Austin Light of GameSpot also cited poor controls, physics, and gameplay glitches. Eurogamers Dan Whitehead felt the controls were weak in comparison to the original Vigilante 8. He further felt the game did not meet up to its potential. 1UP.coms Hayward further agreed with Whitehead, saying "sadly [...] most of Vigilante 8: Arcade's issues are technical in nature".

Vigilante 8 Arcade sold over 60,000 copies as of June 2010. Though reviews of the game had been mixed, some reviewers cited its relatively inexpensive 800 Microsoft Point cost as a selling point.

References

External links

2008 video games
Activision games
Multiplayer online games
Vehicular combat games
Video game remakes
Video games set in the 1970s
Alternate history video games
Video games set in the United States
Xbox 360 Live Arcade games
Xbox 360-only games
Xbox 360 games
Multiplayer and single-player video games
Video games developed in the United States